Oomai Sennaai is a 2021 Indian Tamil-language drama film directed by Arjunan Ekalaivan and starring Michael Thangadurai and Sanam Shetty in the lead roles. Produced by Life Goes On Pictures, it was released on 10 December 2021.

The film narrates the tale of a private detective who decides to change career, but has to deal with the repercussions of the men behind his last assignment. He resultantly gets entangled in a web of challenges posed by greedy politicians, corrupt cops and ruthless gangsters.

Cast 
Michael Thangadurai as Paarthiban
Sanam Shetty as Amudha
Sai Rajkumar
Gajaraj as Rathnam
Jayakumar as Azhagappan
Aroul D Shankar

Production 
The film marked the directorial debut of Arjun Ekalaivan, an erstwhile assistant of Mysskin. The film had tentatively been titled Parthiban, before Oomai Sennaai was finalised.

Sanam Shetty was signed on to play a "de-glam" role in the film in early 2019, and it marked her first theatrical release after her stint and subsequent fame on Bigg Boss Tamil during 2020. The film's team promoted the film across Tamil Nadu in early December 2021.

Release

Theatrical
The film was released on 10 December 2021 across theatres in Tamil Nadu. A critic from the Times of India gave the film a positive review, noting "the film rises up above its modest budget and stays intriguing and impressive most of the time", praising the performances of the technical team and actress Sanam Shetty. Other critics from Tamil newspapers such as Dina Malar and Daily Thanthi also reviewed the film.

Home media
The digital streaming rights of the film is owned by Amazon Prime Video. The film was released on Amazon Prime Video.

References

External links 
 

2020s Tamil-language films
2021 films
Indian drama films